Roman Dragoun (born 8 April 1956) is a Czech singer, songwriter and keyboardist. In 1980–1983 and 2007–present he is member of Progres 2. He was member of Stromboli, T4 and Futurum. He was a session musician for number of musicians and he was singer for musical theatre. In 2012, Dragoun was inducted into Beatová síň slávy (the Beat Hall of Fame).

He is son of painter František Roman Dragoun.

Discography

Solo
Stín mý krve (1995)
Slunci blíž (2000)
Otlučená srdce (2009)

with Progres 2
Třetí kniha džunglí (1982)
The Third Book of Jungle (1983)
Progres Story 1968 – 2008 (2008)

with Futurum
Ostrov Země (1984)
Jedinečná šance (1987)
Ostrov Země/Jedinečná šance (2005)
25. narozeniny (2009)

with Stromboli
Shutdown (1989)

with T4
Pár tónů a slov (2005)

References

External links 

 
 

1956 births
Living people
Czech keyboardists
Czechoslovak male singers
20th-century Czech male singers
21st-century Czech male singers